परवीन बाबी

Parveen Babi (4 April 1949 – 20 January 2005) was an Indian actress and model. Recognized for her roles in Hindi films throughout the 1970s and early 1980s, Babi was known for her "glamorous" acting style, and was one of the highest-paid actresses. Her modeling and fashion sense additionally established her as an icon.  

Babi made her acting debut with the film Charitra (1973), and received recognition for her role as Neela in the drama film Majboor (1974). She had her breakthrough starring as Anita in the action crime-drama film Deewaar (1975), and went on to have roles in many successful films, notably starring as Jenny in Amar Akbar Anthony (1977), Anu in Suhaag (1979), Anita in Kaala Patthar (1979), Sheetal in The Burning Train (1980), Sunita in Shaan (1980), Shallini / Rani in Kaalia (1981), and Nisha in Namak Halaal (1982). In 1976, she was the first Bollywood star to appear on the cover of Time magazine. From the mid-1980s, Babi's career began to fluctuate, leading her to eventually retire from the film industry in 1991.

Babi's personal life has been well-documented by the media; she had remained unmarried after a string of relationships with Kabir Bedi, Danny Denzongpa and Mahesh Bhatt. She was diagnosed with paranoid schizophrenia, which came to the attention of the public following various incidents, as well as diabetes. She also had osteoarthritis of the knee. On 20 January 2005, Babi died of multiple organ failure.

Early life 
Parveen Babi was born on 4 April 1949 in Junagadh, Saurashtra (now in Gujarat). She was the only child in a noble Junagadh-based family who belonged to the Khilji Babi tribe of Pashtuns known as the Pathans of Gujarat that had long settled in Gujarat. Parveen was born fourteen years after the marriage of her parents, her father, Vali Mohammed Khan Babi, was an administrator with the Nawab of Junagadh and her mother was Jamal Bakhte Babi (died 2001). She lost her father in 1959 when she was five years old. She did her early schooling from Mount Carmel High School, Ahmedabad and later attended St. Xavier's College, Ahmedabad where she earned a Bachelor of Arts in English literature.

Career

1972—1975: Modelling, transition to Bollywood and Breakthrough 
Parveen Babi's modelling career began in 1972 and was quickly followed by her film debut with the film Charitra (1973), opposite cricketer Salim Durrani. The film was a flop, but she was noticed and snapped up for several more films. Babi first received recognition for her role as Neela in the drama film Majboor (1974). She had her breakthrough starring as a prostitute, Anita, in the action crime-drama film Deewaar (1975), which attained a cult following, and helped established her as a leading lady.

1975—1982: Established actress 
She went on to appear in many successful films throughout the 1970s and early 1980s, most notably starring as Jenny in Amar Akbar Anthony (1977), Anu in Suhaag (1979), Anita in Kaala Patthar (1979), Sheetal in The Burning Train (1980), Sunita in Shaan (1980), Shallini / Rani in Kaalia (1981), and Nisha in Namak Halaal (1982).

Parveen was one of the most successful actresses of her era, along with Hema Malini, Rekha, Shabana Azmi, Smita Patil, Zeenat Aman and Raakhee. She starred opposite Amitabh Bachchan in eight films, all hits or super-hits. She also starred in other hit films such as Suhaag (1979), Kaala Patthar (1979), and Namak Halaal (1982) opposite Shashi Kapoor, Kala Sona (1975) opposite Feroz Khan, Chandi Sona (1977) opposite Sanjay Khan and Jaani Dost (1983) opposite Dharmendra. Later in her career, she had also appeared in off-beat films such as Vinod Pande's Yeh Nazdeekiyan (1982), playing the "other woman" opposite Marc Zuber, and Dil... Akhir Dil Hai (1982), opposite Naseeruddin Shah.

Her career peaked at the time when most heroines were engulfed in Indian attributes and Babi was one among the few actresses whose attire was completely westernised and this provided her a certain latitude many other contemporary female artists were denied in India's heavily male-dominated and misogynistic cinematic fiefdom. Parveen Babi along with Zeenat Aman with their chiselled looks, well-sculpted bodies and anglicised accents, donned the mantle of the westernized Indian heroine and imparted to the female prima donna of Bollywood their characteristic mannerisms forever. In fact, she acted alongside Aman in Mahaan (1983) and Ashanti (1982) (inspired by the American television show Charlie's Angels, with the third role played by Shabana Azmi).

As Babi's personality symbolized western standards, it was difficult for Bollywood producers to give her the typical bharatiya nari and gaon ki gori roles. She mainly starred in westernized and glamorous roles that established her status as a top heroine. She appeared in several commercially successful films of the era and her main co-stars were Amitabh Bachchan, Shashi Kapoor, Feroz Khan, Dharmendra and Vinod Khanna, all leading stars of the 1970s and 1980s. Aside from acting, Babi also worked as a model in her career. She generally would appear on the front page of every film magazine, including Filmfare, The Stardust, and Bombay Dyeing. She was also the first Bollywood actress to appear on the front page of Time in July 1976, for which she made history; the cover has since become iconic.

She never shied away from portraying roles of women having a live-in relationship with men and consuming alcohol openly, both of which were taboo in those times. The fact that Parveen was paired with Amitabh Bachchan in eight films during the peak of the Big B mania attests to her stature and star power. Amitabh and Parveen complemented each other in the heady first years of the Angry Young Man phenomenon.

1983—2005 
Babi later "disappeared" from the film scene in 1983, informing nobody of her whereabouts, which allowed for exaggerated rumours and pompous claims that she might be "under the control" of figures in the "underworld". Many of her completed films were released in the following years, right up to her last film Akarshan in 1988. She started a career as an interior decorator in 1983. After withdrawing from show business, she took up music, piano, painting, architecture, literature, writing, cultural and archaeological study, politics, photography, sculpture, and human-rights issues. She also made numerous contributions to newspapers and magazines from 1973 to 1992. She lived in a penthouse apartment in Mumbai, living affluently from sound financial investments.

Personal life 

Babi was in a relationship with Danny Denzongpa for four years. Later she dated Kabir Bedi, and then Mahesh Bhatt. Babi was said to have lived alone, and converted to Christianity during the late 1990s. 

On 30 July 1983, Parveen Babi left India and travelled to various countries for a spiritual journey with U. G. Krishnamurti and her friend Valentine and spent some of the time in California and Houston. She returned to Mumbai in November 1989. She was rumoured to have been diagnosed with paranoid schizophrenia, although she regularly denied this, stating that her being labelled as such was a conspiracy by the film industry and the media to malign her image and make her appear insane, so that they could cover up their crimes. This led Parveen to break relationships with most of her friends and family, and becoming reclusive. She accused many foreign dignitaries as well as Indian film personalities, including Amitabh Bachchan, Bill Clinton, Robert Redford, Prince Charles, Al Gore, US government, British government, French government, BJP government, Roman Catholic Church, the CIA, CBI, KGB and Mossad, of conspiring to kill her, but her petition in court was dismissed for lack of evidence; her evidence turned out to be scribblings on a notepad. 

On 7 April 1984, she was suspected at John F. Kennedy International Airport after she failed to submit her identification papers and the authorities handcuffed her and kept her in a general ward with thirty other mentally disturbed patients. The Indian Consul General, who had been informed of the incident, had come to visit her at the hospital. During U.G.'s visit, Parveen smiled and chatted with the consul as though nothing had happened. In an interview to a film magazine dated 1989, she said: "Amitabh Bachchan is a super international gangster. He is after my life. His goons kidnapped me and I was kept on an island where they performed a surgery on me and planted one transmitter/chip/electronic bug right under my ear." There was a photograph of Babi showing a scar below her ears..

In 2002, she again hit the headlines when she filed an affidavit in a special court hearing of the 1993 serial bomb blasts case, claiming that she had gathered clinching evidence against actor Sanjay Dutt showing his involvement in the case, but she did not turn up in court after being summoned, saying that she was afraid of being killed. In the last four years of her life, Babi recorded every phone call, always punctiliously informing the caller about surveillance.

Death 
She was found dead on 22 January 2005 after her residential society secretary alerted the police that she had not collected groceries and newspapers from her doorstep for three days. The police suspected that she may have been dead for up to 72 hours before her body was found. The cause of her death was not immediately known. She was found to have a gangrene of the left foot, a complication of her diabetic condition. A wheelchair was found near her bed along with a series of disarranged paintings, clothes, medicines, and old newspapers. It is possible that she was unable to walk in her last days due to a gangrenous foot and required the use of a wheelchair to move around her flat. A post-mortem was conducted at Cooper Hospital and reports showed that there were no traces of food in her stomach, but some alcohol (possibly from her medication) was found and it is possible that she had not consumed anything for more than three days and as a consequence starved to death. The police ruled out foul play and determined she succumbed to total organ failure and diabetes.

Parveen Babi converted to Christianity during the last years of her life, as she stated in an interview, and was baptised in a Protestant Anglican Church at Malabar Hill. She expressed a desire to be buried as per Christian rites, but her relatives who were Muslims claimed her body after her death and buried her according to Islamic rites. Parveen Babi was buried at Juhu Muslim cemetery in Santacruz, Mumbai.

After her death the State Administrator General of Maharashtra became sole custodian of her properties and assets. Following her death, chaos erupted when various distant relatives filed petitions with the high court regarding the will of her property which had been lying in the locker of a Junagadh bank, executed jointly by actor and friend Murad Khan Babi. The will stated that 70% of her property was to be put in a trust in her name to help poor members of the Babi family. 20% was pledged to Murad Khan Babi, for being "a guiding force", and 10% was to be given to Christian missionary funds.

Five years later, due to a shortage of land space for burials, Parveen Babi's grave along with other luminary Bollywood celebrities, such as Mohammed Rafi, Madhubala, Sahir Ludhianvi, Talat Mahmood, Naushad Ali, who were interred at Santa Cruz Muslim Cemetery, were exhumed and their remains were relocated to a new resting place.

In popular culture
Mahesh Bhatt, Babi's former partner, wrote and directed Arth (1982), a supposedly semi-autobiographical film about his relationship with Babi, and wrote and produced Woh Lamhe (2006) directed by his nephew Mohit Suri, based on his recollection and interpretation of his relationship with Babi and without any inputs from her.

Designer Manish Malhotra said: "Parveen Babi brought minimalism into fashion. She was always impeccable, not overdoing it even once."

Filmography 
In her acting career which spanned almost ten years, she acted in more than fifty films, of which ten were blockbusters.

See also
List of Indian film actresses
Balasinor State
Pathans of Gujarat

Further reading

References

External links 
 

1954 births
2005 deaths
Actresses from Gujarat
Actresses in Hindi cinema
Actresses in Gujarati cinema
20th-century Indian actresses
Indian film actresses
Indian Anglicans
Indian former Muslims
Indian people of Pashtun descent
Converts to Anglicanism from Islam
People from Junagadh
People with schizophrenia
Gujarati people
Rajneesh movement